Lokomotiv 1929 Mezdra was a Bulgarian football club from the city of Mezdra.

History
The team was founded in 2011 before dissolving of the original club PFC Lokomotiv Mezdra. In 2012 its promoted to V Group and gets to the Third Round of the Bulgarian Cup, but its drawn from V Group and send to Regional Group.

In 2015 team qualified again for the Bulgarian Cup, but lost in First Round from the Bulgarian champion Ludogorets Razgrad.

Past seasons

References

External links
bgclubs.eu

Football clubs in Bulgaria
Association football clubs established in 2011
2011 establishments in Bulgaria
2016 disestablishments in Bulgaria
Association football clubs disestablished in 2016
Mezdra
Mezdra